is a wrestling video game for Super Famicom. It was released on August 6, 1993 to an exclusively Japanese audience with an endorsement by Japanese professional wrestler Atsushi Onita.

Player have to fight their way through a fictionalised version of the Frontier Martial-Arts Wrestling organization; the wrestling promotion Onita owned, booked and was the star of throughout the nineties, portrayed in this game to be more of a tournament of the Street Fighter variety than a realistic wrestling company. According to the official slogan of the game, it was considered to incorporate an entire batch of innovative ideas. The instruction manual for the game talked about the virtual pursuit of achieving the total potential of each wrestler.

Gameplay
The game is essentially a professional wrestling-style of video game that was remade into more of a "tournament" fighter. Each fight is a "death match" and seven of these must be fought in order to be crowned the champion. While this game feels like a Street Fighter II clone with a wrestling theme, it manages to capture the spirit of having the fighter with the best 2-out-of-3 rounds win the fight.

However, stepping on these land mines costs players a lot of their energy; re-enacting the hardcore matches of the FMW promotion in addition to Onita's typical matches.

Each character has a gauge based on his spiritual strength (soul), physical strength (root), and mental strength (mind). The spirit of the player's characters can be recharged by getting the character to yell at the opponent.

Wrestlers

Playable wrestlers
Atsushi Onita
Tarzan Goto
Ricky Fuji
Sambo Asako
Megumi Kudo – hidden character

Non-playable bosses
 Ryuzo Yashajin
 Killer Marshalborg
 Knuckles Bomb
 Discover Love
 Giantonio Inoba (Hybrid of Giant Baba and Antonio Inoki)
 Masked Bondage
 King Shadow
 Combat Toyoda - opponent in Megumi Kudo's hidden match

See also

List of licensed wrestling video games

References

1993 video games
Japan-exclusive video games
Pony Canyon games
Professional wrestling games
Super Nintendo Entertainment System games
Super Nintendo Entertainment System-only games
Fighting games
Multiplayer and single-player video games
Video games developed in Japan